The following is a list of Malayalam films released in the year 1993.

References

 1993
1993
Malayalam
 Mal
1993 in Indian cinema